The 2006 RS:X World Championships were held at the Lake Garda in Trentino, Italy between September 23 and September 30, 2006.

Men's results

^ Bouman finished in a higher position during the medal race

Women's results

See also
Windsurfing World Championships

External links
Official website
Results @ rsxclass.com

2006
2006 in sailing
RS:X competitions